Wriggler is a Spectrum and Amstrad maze game published in 1985 by Romantic Robot. The original release of Wriggler contained an instrumental track on the B-side titled "Moons of Jupiter," composed by Alexander Goldscheider.

Gameplay
Wriggler is based around maggot racing other maggots. The player controls a maggot and has to escape a maze consisting of 256 screens. The maze is divided into sections: garden, underground, hell, planet surface, the dungeon.

Development

The graphics, animation and cassette inlay artwork were created by Allin Kempthorne while still at school. He went on to become a writer and cartoonist for The Sun newspaper. He later became an actor and comedian, most noted for writing and starring in the comedy feature film The Vampires of Bloody Island. The Spectrum version was programmed by his twin brother Matthew Kempthorne, and the Amstrad version was programmed by Matthew Kempthorne and David Vivian. 

A version of Wriggler was developed for the Enterprise (ported directly from the Amstrad version), but not released.

An article on The Making of Wriggler appeared in issue 114 of Retro Gamer Magazine. Written by Graeme Mason, it contains interviews with both Matthew and Allin Kempthorne.

Reception
Wriggler became the Star Game in Personal Computer News  and the Game of the Month in CRASH magazine.

References

External links
 

 

Amstrad CPC games
Maze games
ZX Spectrum games
1985 video games
Video games about insects
Video games developed in the United Kingdom
Single-player video games